Urubici is a southern Brazilian municipality located in the state of Santa Catarina.

History

Economy
The economy of the region is based on agriculture and tourism.

Neighboring cities
Some of the nearest cities are São Joaquim-60 km (37.28 mi.), Lages, Tubarão, and Criciúma.

Access
Access to the city is by the SC-110 state highway.

Climate
The climate of the area is temperate, with temperatures ranging between 12 °C (53.6 °F) and 16 °C (60.8 °F). In the months of June, July, and August, the thermometers get to show negative temperatures, and it can snow.
The minimum record temperature (it's also the Brazilian minimum record temperature) was -17.8 °C (0 °F) at Morro da Igreja, the highest inhabited point of this municipality.

Universities and colleges

Schools

Environment
Several entities and NGOs promote environment conservation of this region, among them is the Instituto Serrano de Conservação da Natureza.

Tourism
The town of Urubici was founded in 1915, as the village of São Joaquim. Today, its natural beauties attract tourists and backpackers from all corners of Brazil looking for the landscapes of the mountain ridge of the state of Santa Catarina. Located in the valley of the Canoas river, the town has in its hills, valleys, trails and waterfalls places for those who want to rest or go for ecotourism and adventure tourism. Urubici is part of the São Joaquim National park, which is very rich in flora and fauna. A visit to it reveals incredible landscapes, such as the Laranjeiras Canyon (Canyon of the Orange Trees) and the famous Pedra Furada (Holed Rock), which can be seen from the Morro da Igreja (Church Hill), known as the highest point in the South of Brazil, with 1,827 meters (5,994.09 ft.) of altitude. In the surroundings of the town there are other places that deserve a visit, such as the Avencal Waterfall, with 100 meters (328.08 ft.) of free fall, and indigenous caves that are found in the area. There it is possible to see rupestral engravings which date back to more than four thousand years ago. In the severe winter, between the months of June and August, there can be some snow, which gives a European appearance to its streets. In 1996, the town registered the lowest temperature ever recorded in thermometers in Brazil, −17.8 °C (0.04 °F). It is the ideal weather for those who like chatting in front of a fireplace, sipping some good wine, or just relax. Throughout its history, Urubici suffered the influence of Portuguese, Italian, German, African and Latvian settlers, who have left their characteristics in its culture, arts, architecture, and cuisine. The city is also known as the land of the vegetables because of the variety and quality of the local production.

Gallery

References

External links

 Municipal Government site of the city (in Portuguese)

 
1956 establishments in Brazil
Populated places established in 1956
Municipalities in Santa Catarina (state)